The 3rd Battalion (Toronto Regiment), Canadian Expeditionary Force was an infantry battalion of the Canadian Expeditionary Force that saw service in the First World War. It was created on 2 September 1914 with recruits from Toronto, primarily from the Queen's Own Rifles of Canada with additional drafts from the 10th Royal Grenadiers and the Governor General's Body Guard.

History

They arrived in England on 16 October with a strength of 42 officers and 1123 men. The battalion became part of the 1st Canadian Division, 1st Canadian Infantry Brigade where it saw action at Ypres, Vimy Ridge and along the Western Front. It was later reinforced by the 12th Canadian Reserve Battalion.

In the attack on Vimy Ridge, the battalion had a relatively easy time due to very successful artillery barrages but still lost around 150 killed or wounded.

286 soldiers of the 3rd Battalion were taken prisoner during the war - all but 21 during the 2nd Battle of Ypres during April and May 1915.

Demobilization, re-organization and perpetuation

The battalion returned to Canada from England on the SS Olympic arriving in Halifax on 21 April 1919, then in Toronto by train and demobilizing in the afternoon of 23 April 1919. Only 40 of the original contingent from 1914 arrived back at the end of the war although others had been demobilized or taken prisoners of war. [See list below.]

With the re-organization of the Canadian Militia, it was recreated as The Toronto Regiment by General Order dated 1 May 1920. On 15 December 1936 it was amalgamated with the Royal Grenadiers to form the Royal Regiment of Toronto Grenadiers which subsequently became the known as The Royal Regiment of Canada, 11 February 1939.

Today the battalion is perpetuated by The Queen's Own Rifles of Canada and The Royal Regiment of Canada.

Commanding officers
All three Commanding Officers had previously served in the Canadian Militia with The Queen's Own Rifles of Canada:
 August 1914 to November 1915 - Lieutenant Colonel Robert Rennie, MVO (later Major General Rennie, CB, CMG, DSO, MVO, VD)
 November 1915 to October 1916 - Lieutenant Colonel William D. Allan, DSO (He died as the results of an earlier wound.)
 October 1916 to April 1919 - Lieutenant Colonel Joseph B. Rogers, CMG, DSO, MC

Battle honours 
The following battle honours were awarded the regiment for service in France and Belgium (those in capital letters were authorized to be shown on the Regimental Colours):

YPRES 1915
Gravenstafel
ST JULIEN
FESTUBERT 1915
MOUNT SORREL
SOMME 1916

Pozières
Flers-Courcelette
Ancre Heights
Arras 1917
VIMY 1917
Arleux

Scarpe 1917
Hill 70
Ypres, 1917
PASSCHENDAELE
AMIENS
Arras, 1918

Scarpe 1918
DROCOURT-QUEANT
Hindenberg Line
CANAL DU NORD
Pursuit to Mons
France and Flanders 1915-18

Honours Awarded

 2 Victoria Crosses (VC)
 1 Companion of the Order of St Michael and St George (CMG)
 11 Distinguished Service Order (DSO)
 2 Bars to the Distinguished Service Order
 1 Officer of the Most Excellent Order of the British Empire (OBE)

 50 Military Crosses
 11 Bars to the Military Cross
 42 Distinguished Conduct Medals
 235 Military Medals

 23 Bars to the Military Medal
 6 Meritorious Service Medals
 9 Foreign Decorations
 44 Mentioned in Despatches

See also 

 List of infantry battalions in the Canadian Expeditionary Force

References

External links
 Transcribed War Diaries of the 3rd Battalion, CEF 19 October 1914 to 28 February 1919
 Canadian Expeditionary Study Group - 3rd Battalion page

003
Queen's Own Rifles of Canada
Military units and formations of Ontario
1914 establishments in Ontario
Military units and formations established in 1914
Military units and formations disestablished in 1919
Royal Regiment of Canada